Eugene Onegin, is a 1911 Russian short film directed by Vasili Goncharov.

Plot 
The film is based on the 1825-1832 poem Eugene Onegin by Alexander Pushkin.

Starring 
 Lyubov Varyagina as Tatyana
 Aleksandra Goncharova as Ol'ga
 Pyotr Chardynin as Onegin
 Aleksandr Gromov as Lensky
 Arseny Bibikov as Gremin
 Petr Birjukov
 Andrey Gromov

References

External links 
 

1911 films
1910s Russian-language films
Russian silent short films
1911 short films
Russian black-and-white films
Films directed by Vasily Goncharov
Films of the Russian Empire
Films based on works by Aleksandr Pushkin